Carbacanthographis halei is a species of corticolous (bark-dwelling) lichen in the family Graphidaceae. Found in insular Malaysia, it was formally described as a new species in 2022 by Shirley Cunha Feuerstein and Robert Lücking. The type specimen was collected from a lowland oak-dipterocarp forest in Bako National Park (Sarawak). The specific epithet honours American lichenologist Mason Hale, who collected the type in 1965.

The lichen has an olive-yellow thallus with a distinct cortex and an indistinct prothallus. Its ascospores are hyaline, measuring 5–35 by 7–8 μm with between 9 and 13 transverse septa. Carbacanthographis halei contains stictic acid and norstictic acid, which are lichen products that can be detected using thin-layer chromatography.

References

halei
Lichen species
Lichens described in 2022
Lichens of Malaysia
Taxa named by Robert Lücking